The Battle of Dương Liễu–Nhông Pass was a battle in the Vietnam War taking place at Dương Liễu and Đèo Nhông (located on Route 1), in the area of Phù Mỹ district, Bình Định province, between the 2nd Regiment (An Lao Regiment, 3 Gold Star Division) of the South Vietnamese Liberation Army and 2 infantry battalions, 1 armored division of the Army of the Republic of Vietnam. The anniversary of this battle is usually counted according to the lunar calendar (January 5 of the solar calendar), and there are records that the battle took place from February 7 to February 8, 1965.

Developments 
In the spring of 1965, in order to coordinate with the entire Southern battlefield and gain the initiative in Phù Mỹ area, the A1 Front Command was quickly established under the direction of the Party Committee of Zone V, the High Command of the Vietnamese Army, Zone V and Bình Định Provincial Party Committee. Immediately after, Dương Liễu fort (now Sa Lem hill) was chosen as the first attack point of the National Guard.

At 0:30 on the night of the 4th and 5th, the main force of the 2nd Battalion, 2nd Regiment and the local soldiers of Phù Mỹ district, secretly and suddenly raided Dương Liễu fort. The Viet Cong quickly gained battlefield superiority in ten minutes, and completely annihilated one ARVN company and four militia platoons, killed nearly 200 enemy troops, and collected 170 guns and a variety of military equipment and weapons. The ARVN defenses along Route 1 north of Bình Định were severely threatened.

Judging that Duong Lieu fort was an important position, the enemy would send troops to retake it. On the way, they would have to pass through Deo Nong, so An Lao Regiment arranged 1st Battalion and 3rd Battalion to ambush in this area. .

Facing the defeat at Gia Hựu fortress (Hoài Nhơn) and Dương Liễu fort, the ARVN troops reacted in a vigilant position. After 2 days of exploration, on the 7th day of the Lunar New Year, the ARVN sent two battalions of the 41st Regiment and two detachments of M-113 armored vehicles, with artillery and combat aircraft to support them along Route 1 from the district town of Phù Mỹ. The US moved to Dương Liễu to clear and re-occupy. On the way to pull troops to Deo Nong, despite careful reconnaissance, bombing and fierce bombardment along both sides of the road, the ARVN still could not detect the enemy's ambush force. Meanwhile, despite being continuously bombarded by enemy artillery along the way, causing a number of casualties, the soldiers of the Liberation Army still calmly waited for the order to launch. At 2:00 p.m. on the same day, when the front group of enemy vehicles and infantry encountered the NVA's ambush line at Deo Nong, the forces of the 1st Battalion of the National Guard quickly closed the encirclement by locking its tail at Đá Dốc (Diêm Tiêu) and the entire ARVN force was in an ambush formation and was attacked. From high points, the Viet Cong firepower was trained to shoot at the enemy's central formation. Despite being attacked by surprise, with the majority and superiority of weapons, the ARVN fought back quite fiercely. Their artillery positions and groups of fighter planes poured artillery and bombs on the battlefield, but they could not stop the advance of the Viet Cong. The Viet Cong quickly approached the enemy formation, using personal tactics of close combat to neutralize the enemy's firepower.

At 16:30 on the same day, the Viet Cong completely controlled the battlefield, obliterating two armored vehicle detachments of the ARVN. Suffering heavy damage, on the afternoon of the 7th Lunar New Year, the M-113 detachment consisting of three aircraft and the rest of the ARVN troops withdrew to Phù Mỹ. The remnants of the ARVN troops, including the remaining American advisors who ran outside, were captured and destroyed by guerrillas in Mỹ Trinh and Mỹ Phong communes. During this time, at the An Luong stronghold east of the district capital, the commune militia and guerrillas coordinated with the masses to organize an uprising and gain control in Mỹ Chánh commune.

Result 
After two hours of fighting at Nhông Pass, the Viet Cong killed more than 700 enemy troops, burned four aircraft, destroyed ten M-113 armored vehicles, captured two vehicles intact, and collected all military equipment. Today, the anniversary of the victory of Duong Lieu - Deo Nong has become an important cultural holiday of Bình Định province. The Festival of Victory Deo Nong - Duong Lieu takes place on the 5th day of the first lunar month every year, which is considered one of the traditional historical festivals of the people of Phù Mỹ and Bình Định.

References 

1965 in Vietnam
Battles and operations of the Vietnam War in 1965
Battles involving Vietnam
Battles involving the United States